Eupyrgus is a genus of sea cucumbers. It is the only genus in the monotypic family Eupyrgidae.

Species
There are two species recognised in the genus Eupyrgus:
 Eupyrgus pacificus Östergren, 1905
 Eupyrgus scaber Lütken, 1857

References

Molpadiida
Holothuroidea genera